WTZP-LD, virtual channel 50 (UHF digital channel 31), is a low-powered Cozi TV-affiliated television station serving Charleston-Huntington, West Virginia, United States that is licensed to Portsmouth, Ohio. The station is owned by Eagle Broadcasting Group. On cable, the station is available on Time Warner Cable channel 24 within the Charleston/Huntington market, and TWC channel 73 in Jackson, Ohio, as well as TWC channel 23 in South Webster, Ohio.

Coverage area

WTZP-LD covers five counties in south-central Ohio, as well as Greenup and Lewis Counties in northeastern Kentucky. Grade B coverage is also available as far as Ashland and Morehead, Kentucky, as well as Huntington, West Virginia.

Programming
WTZP-LD broadcasts a local news program at 6:00PM  on weeknights. Local sports programming from area schools in southern Ohio, as well as Portsmouth-area events are also featured. Children's Educational (E/I) programming is aired from 10 a.m. to Noon ET Saturdays, and 10-11 a.m. ET Sundays. The remaining parts of the station's program schedule is filled with programming from Cozi TV.

Digital channels
The station's digital signal is multiplexed:

WTZP-LD's third subchannel was launched in late 2015 to carry Laff programming, however in early 2017, Laff programming was replaced by Buzzr.

References

External links
WTZP-LD Channel 50 Official Website
Z-24 The Zone on Facebook
Query the FCC’s TV station database for WTZP-LD
CDBS (RecNet) Information on WTZP-LD

Cozi TV affiliates
True Crime Network affiliates
Buzzr affiliates
TZP-LD
Television channels and stations established in 1989
1989 establishments in Ohio
Low-power television stations in the United States